Kantharia is a town and former minor Rajput princely state on Saurashtra peninsula in Gujarat, western India.

History 
The non-salute princely state in jhalawar prant ruled by jhala rajput chieftains.It comprised town and another village.
In 1901 it has a combined population 1533 yielding a state revenue of rupees 11000.

Sources an external links 
 Imperial Gazetteer on dsal.uchicago.edu - Kathiawar

Princely states of Gujarat
Rajput princely states